Central Franconian refers to the following continuum of West Central German dialects:
 Ripuarian (spoken in the German state of North Rhine-Westphalia, in eastern Belgium, and the southeastern tip of Dutch Limburg)
 Moselle Franconian (in German Rhineland-Palatinate and Saarland, in eastern Belgium and French Lorraine)
 Luxembourgish (in Luxembourg and the adjacent areas of Belgium and France)
Luxembourgish is often included within Moselle Franconian, but sometimes regarded as a separate group. The German-speaking Community of Belgium comprises both Ripuarian and Moselle Franconian dialects. The Central Franconian dialects are part of the Rhinelandic continuum stretching from the Low Franconian language area in the northwest to the Rhine Franconian dialects in the southeast.
Along with Limburgish, Central Franconian has a simple tone system called pitch accent.

The Central Franconian language area is not to be confused with the Bavarian administrative district of Middle Franconia, where East Franconian dialects are spoken.

The Central Franconian dialects are of particular interest to linguists because of the tonal distinctions made between different words, for example (Ripuarian) zɛɪ (tonal accent 1) "sieve" vs. zɛɪ (tonal accent 2) "she". See Pitch-accent languages#Franconian dialects.

References

See also 
 Low Franconian
 East Franconian
 South Franconian

West Germanic languages